During the 1978–79 English football season, Brentford competed in the Football League Third Division. After a rude awakening to third-tier football, the Bees ended the season strongly to finish in 10th position.

Season summary 
After Brentford's promotion to the Third Division at the end of the previous season, manager Bill Dodgin Jr. stated that his squad would only need one or two more new players to be able to compete during the club's first season in the third tier since 1972–73. He managed to keep prolific forwards Steve Phillips and Andrew McCulloch at Griffin Park, with the former turning down a £120,000 transfer to Tottenham Hotspur. Aside from goalkeeping trialist Trevor Porter (brought in to cover for car crash-victim Len Bond and the suspended Graham Cox), Dodgin made no significant signings.

Fears that Brentford's largely-unchanged squad would be out of its depth in the Third Division were heightened after the season began with a 7–1 aggregate defeat to fellow third-tier side Watford in the first round of the League Cup. A dire start to the league season, which had seen Brentford sink into the relegation places by the end of September 1978, led manager Bill Dodgin Jr. to act in the transfer market. Potentially club-record breaking bids for Watford's Alan Mayes, Queens Park Rangers' Tony Hazell and Bristol City's John Bain were all rejected. Dodgin managed to sign defender Jim McNichol from Luton Town for a new club-record incoming fee of £30,000. While McNichol went on to be voted the Brentford Supporters' Player of the Year, Dodgin's other signing, forward Dean Smith (signed to support the misfiring Steve Phillips and Andrew McCulloch), only scored sporadically during the remainder of the season.

Between late-October 1978 and mid-March 1979, the Bees stabilised with a run of just two defeats in 17 league matches. The run ended with the club's biggest win of the season – a 6–0 thrashing of Chester at Griffin Park, with Steve Phillips scoring a hat-trick to boost his tally to six goals in four matches. The signing of Jim McNichol made an immediate impact on the defensive line, with a record of two clean sheets prior to his arrival being turned around to 14 in the following 31 matches, equivalent to a clean sheet nearly every other match. A failure to win any of the following four matches dropped the Bees back to 18th position, but a strong run of 9 wins in 12 matches to close out the season elevated the club to a 10th-place finish.

League table

Results
Brentford's goal tally listed first.

Legend

Pre-season and friendlies

Football League Third Division

FA Cup

Football League Cup 

 Sources: 100 Years of Brentford, The Big Brentford Book of the Seventies,Croxford, Lane & Waterman, p. 314. Statto

Playing squad 
Players' ages are as of the opening day of the 1978–79 season.

 Sources: The Big Brentford Book of the Seventies, Timeless Bees

Coaching staff

Statistics

Appearances and goals
Substitute appearances in brackets.

Players listed in italics left the club mid-season.
Source: 100 Years of Brentford

Goalscorers 

Players listed in italics left the club mid-season.
Source: 100 Years of Brentford

Management

Summary

Transfers & loans

Awards 
 Supporters' Player of the Year: Jim McNichol
 Players' Player of the Year: Len Bond

References 

Brentford F.C. seasons
Brentford